Jacob Goldenthal (1815, Brody -1867) was an academic orientalist born in the Austro-Hungarian Empire.

He studied ancient languages at the University of Leipzig and received his Ph.D. there in 1845.

Publications 
 Al-Ghazalis Meisan al-Almal (Leipzig 1839) A German translation of Criterion of Action
 Todrosis hebräische Bearbeitung des Averroesschen Kommentars zu Aristoteles' Rhetorik (1842)
 Kalonymi apologia Maimonidis (1845)
 Nissim ben Jakobs Clavis talmudica (Wien 1847)
 Rieti und Marini oder Dante und Ovid in hebräischer Umkleidung (1851)

References

Leipzig University alumni
1815 births
1867 deaths